Anterolateral sulcus may refer to:
 Anterolateral sulcus of medulla
 Anterolateral sulcus of spinal cord